Denton Halt was a halt between Milton Road Halt and Milton Range Halt on the Hundred of Hoo Railway. It opened in July 1906 and closed on 4 December 1961.
The station was demolished after closure and there are no remains today. The level crossing adjacent to the station was closed in 1971 and replaced with a footbridge.

References

Sources

External links
 Subterranea Britannica

Disused railway stations in Kent
Former South Eastern Railway (UK) stations
Railway stations in Great Britain opened in 1906
Railway stations in Great Britain closed in 1961
1906 establishments in England
1961 disestablishments in England
Gravesham